Nicholaus is a masculine given name. People with that name include the following:

 Nicholaus Arson the stage name of Niklas Almqvist (born 1977), Swedish musician
 Nicholaus Contreraz (1982 – 1998), American torture victim
 Nicholaus Goossen (born 1978), American director
 Nicholaus John Michael Gordon (born 1991), Canadian singer, rapper, and songwriter known by his stage name Lil Pappie
 Nicholaus R. Kipke (born 1979), American politician known as Nic Kipke
 Nicholaus Marx, American politician
 Nicholaus Szewczyk (born 1995), Polish businessman 
 Nicholaus Cummins (born 1995), American physician

See also

 Nicholas
 Nickolaus
 Nicolaus
 Church of Saint Nicholaus, Senec

Masculine given names